Samuel Simms (1836 – 22 February 1885) was an English organist and composer.

Background

He was born in Stourbridge in 1836, the son of Samuel Simms also an organist.

He succeeded his father as organist of St. Thomas's Church, Stourbridge and held two other organist positions in Birmingham.

He founded the Brierley Hill Choral Society and conducted it from its formation.

He died at Stourbridge on 22 February 1885, and his son, also Samuel, succeeded him as organist at St Cyprian's Church, Hay Mills. He was interred in the churchyard of St. Mary's Church, Oldswinford.

Appointments
Organist of St Thomas' Church, Stourbridge 1868? - ????
Organist of St John's Church, Ladywood ???? - 1879
Organist of St Cyprian's Church, Hay Mills 1879 - 1885

Compositions

His compositions included Services, anthems, and organ pieces.

References

1836 births
1885 deaths
English organists
British male organists
English composers
People from Stourbridge
19th-century British composers
19th-century English musicians
19th-century British male musicians
19th-century organists